The Castle of Grignan (French: Château de Grignan) is a 12th-century castle built on a rocky outcrop overlooking Grignan in Drôme Provençale, transformed into a fortress in the 13th century by the Adhémar family.

References

Châteaux in Drôme
Monuments historiques of Drôme
Castles in Auvergne-Rhône-Alpes